Ivanhoe Gambini (25 March 1904 – 23 December 1992) was an Italian painter. His work was part of the painting event in the art competition at the 1936 Summer Olympics.

References

1904 births
1992 deaths
20th-century Italian painters
Italian male painters
Olympic competitors in art competitions
People from Busto Arsizio
20th-century Italian male artists